Error is the second mini-album by the South Korean boy band VIXX. It was released on October 14, 2014 under the label of Jellyfish Entertainment. It features the single of the same name. The song, along with its music video was also released in Japan in Japanese under CJ Victor Entertainment as their Japanese debut. The song was then finally released in China and Taiwan in Chinese through QQ and in Taiwan through KKBOX.

Promotion
VIXX began promoting this album on MBC Music's Show Champion on October 15, 2014. "Error" won five music program awards, one each on Show Champion, Music Bank and Inkigayo, and two on The Show.

Composition
"Error" was written by lyricist Kim Eana, Jellyfish CEO Hwang Se-jun and in house producers MELODESIGN. The song's music video was directed by Hong Won-ki of ZanyBros, who directed most of their previous music videos. The music video features Heo Youngji from Kara as Cyborg Girl.

Track listing
The credits are adapted from the official homepage of the group.

Japanese single
The single peaked at number 6 on the Oricon charts and sold over 19,381 CD copies.

Chart performance

Awards and nominations

Awards

Music program awards

Release history

See also
 List of Gaon Album Chart number ones of 2014
 List of K-pop albums on the Billboard charts

References

External links
 
 
 Error on iTunes

2014 EPs
VIXX albums
Jellyfish Entertainment EPs
Stone Music Entertainment EPs